Chester Township is a township in 
Howard County, Iowa, USA.

References

Howard County, Iowa
Townships in Iowa